List of speakers of the Chamber of Deputies of Czechoslovakia.

Below is a list of office-holders:

Sources

Czechoslovakia, Chamber of Deputies
Chairmen
Czechoslovakia